Maarten Jurgens (born 18 August 1944) is a Dutch equestrian. He competed in two events at the 1972 Summer Olympics.

References

External links
 

1944 births
Living people
Dutch male equestrians
Olympic equestrians of the Netherlands
Equestrians at the 1972 Summer Olympics
Sportspeople from Nijmegen